Long Zhiyi (1929 – 31 December 2021) was a Chinese novelist and politician of Yi ethnicity who served as chairman of the Guizhou Provincial Committee of the Chinese People's Political Consultative Conference between 1993 and 1998. He was a representative of the 13th, 14th and 15th National Congress of the Chinese Communist Party. He was a member of the 9th and 8th National Committees of the Chinese People's Political Consultative Conference. He was a delegate to the 10th National People's Congress.

Early life and career
Long was born in Tuanjie Township of Yongshan County, Yunnan, in 1929. He graduated from Yunnan University. He took part in the communist revolution in 1949. He began to publish his works in 1947 and joined the China Writers Association in 1991. In 1987, he was appointed deputy party secretary of Guizhou, concurrently serving as head of its Organization Department. He became chairman of the Guizhou Provincial Committee of the Chinese People's Political Consultative Conference in January 1993, and served until January 1998.

Personal life and death
In 1952, Long married Ye Shenzhen in Guizhou, their son named Long Long and their grandson nicknamed Youyou. He died in Guiyang, Guizhou on 31 December 2021, at the age of 92.

Works

Novels

Collection of short stories

Collection of Short Stories by Long Zhiyi

Collection of essays

References

1929 births
2021 deaths
Yi people
People from Yongshan County
Yunnan University alumni
People's Republic of China politicians from Yunnan
Chinese Communist Party politicians from Yunnan
Delegates to the 10th National People's Congress
Members of the 8th Chinese People's Political Consultative Conference
Members of the 9th Chinese People's Political Consultative Conference